Cadman may refer to:

People
 Cadman (surname)
 Baron Cadman, Peerage of the United Kingdom, created 1937

Places
 Cadman Glacier, located in Graham Coast, Antarctica
 Cadman Plaza, located in Brooklyn, New York
 Cadman's Cottage, oldest surviving residential building in Sydney

Streets
 Cadman Road, Bridlington
 Cadman Road, Intake, Sheffield
 Cadman Street, Mosborough, Sheffield